Mary Wilhelmine Williams (May 14, 1878 – March 10, 1944) specialized in Latin American history. She was on the board of editors of the Hispanic American Historical Review from 1927 to 1933 and was secretary of the Conference on Latin American History in 1928 and 1934.

Williams is credited for starting the first collegiate course in Canadian history in the United States in 1916. She contributed to the Dictionary of American Biography and wrote two books on Scandinavia.

Williams was an active feminist and pacifist. She was a member of the Women's International League for Peace and Freedom and was founder of the California chapter of the National Woman's Party in California. Also, she was the editor of Equal Rights, an independent feminist weekly from 1935 to 1936.

Biography 

Williams was born on May 14, 1878, on a remote farm in Stanislaus County, California. Her mother, Caroline Madsen, was from Denmark and her father, Charles Williams, was born in Sweden. Williams came from a large and impoverished family of four sisters and two brothers.

At the age of eighteen Williams attended San Jose State Normal School in California and graduated in 1901. She was a teacher for three years before attending Stanford University, where she received her M.A. in 1908. Williams went back to teaching from 1908 to 1911 while studying at the University of Chicago during the summers. She took a trip to London, England, in 1911 to research her doctoral dissertation at the Public Record Office. Williams received her Ph.D. in 1914 and became an instructor in history at Stanford University. Her dissertation, Anglo-American Isthmian Diplomacy, 1815–1915, won the Justin Winsor Prize of the American Historical Association. From 1914 to 1915 Williams was an instructor in history at Wellesley College. Williams taught at Goucher College in Baltimore as a professor in 1920.

From 1918 to 1919 Williams served the government of Honduras as a cartographic, geographic, and historical specialist in relation with its border disagreements with Guatemala and Nicaragua. On behalf of the American Association of University Women, Williams traveled to fifteen Latin American countries to survey their higher education facilities for women in 1926. The US State Department appointed Williams to serve on a variety of committees dealing with Latin American problems. In 1940 she was presented with a decoration from the Dominican government in recognition of her work in promoting understanding between the two countries.

She remained a professor at Goucher College until 1940 when she retired to Palo Alto, California. Williams died suddenly from a stroke on March 10, 1944. Her grave is marked "Teacher, Historian, Pacifist, Feminist."

Legacy 

As a teacher, Williams is remembered for her thorough standards of scholarship, her persistence for complete mastery of a subject matter, and her encouragement of students in undertaking independent research.

Her book, The People and Politics of Latin America, has for fourteen years been an important foundation for teachers and students in the field of Latin-American history.

Works 

1916: Cousin-hunting in Scandinavia
1916: Anglo-American Isthmian Diplomacy, 1815–1915
1920: Social Scandinavia in the Viking Age
1930: The People and Politics of Latin America
1937: Dom Pedro the Magnanimous, Second Emperor of Brazil

See also
 List of peace activists

References

External links 
Guide to the Mary Wilhelmine Williams Papers, 1911-1943 held at Stanford University

1944 deaths
1878 births
Historians of Latin America
American feminists
American pacifists
Pacifist feminists
Goucher College faculty and staff
American women historians
Women's International League for Peace and Freedom people
People from Stanislaus County, California
San Jose State University alumni
Stanford University alumni
University of Chicago alumni
Activists from California
American people of Swedish descent
American people of Danish descent
Historians from California